Sir William Scott, 6th Baronet of Ancrum MP FRSE (26 July 1803 – 12 October 1871) was a Scottish Liberal politician who sat in the House of Commons from 1829 to 1830 and 1859 to 1870.

Life
Scott was the son of Sir John Scott, 5th Baronet of Ancrum and his wife Harriett Graham, daughter  William Graham of Gartmore House, Stirlingshire.

He inherited the baronetcy on the death of his father in 1814. He was educated at the Royal Military College, Sandhurst, and became a lieutenant in the 2nd Battalion Life Guards. He was a Deputy Lieutenant and J.P. for Roxburghshire and a J.P. for Forfarshire. He was a Fellow of the Royal Society of Scotland.

In February 1829, Scott was elected Member of Parliament for Carlisle and held the seat to July 1830. At the 1859 general election Scott was elected MP for Roxburghshire. He held the seat until 1870.

Scott died at the age of 68.

Family
In 1828 Scott married Elizabeth Anderson, daughter of David Anderson of Balgay House near Dundee, Forfarshire. They had issue, including Henry Warren Scott (1833–1889), Queen Elizabeth The Queen Mother's maternal step-grandfather.

References

External links
 

1803 births
1871 deaths
Baronets in the Baronetage of Nova Scotia
British Life Guards officers
Graduates of the Royal Military College, Sandhurst
People from Stirling (council area)
UK MPs 1826–1830
Liberal Party (UK) MPs for English constituencies
UK MPs 1859–1865
UK MPs 1865–1868
UK MPs 1868–1874
Scottish Liberal Party MPs
Members of the Parliament of the United Kingdom for Scottish constituencies